Juha Suomaa (born January 13, 1988) is a Finnish former professional ice hockey left winger.

Suomaa began his career with Ilves where he played at U16, U18 and U20 level between 2003 and 2009, but was unable to break into the team's senior side. In 2009, he joined LeKi and spent the next four seasons with the team. On September 26, 2013, Suomaa joined Pyry of the Suomi-sarja but would return to Leki by January 2014. In total, Suomaa played 204 games in Mestis, all with LeKi.

On July 25, 2014, Suomaa moved to France to sign for Bisons de Neuilly-sur-Marne of the FFHG Division 1 but played just three games for the team before being released where he rejoined Pyry on October 16, 2014. The 2014–15 season would be Suomma's final season before retiring.

References

External links

1988 births
Living people
Bisons de Neuilly-sur-Marne players
Finnish ice hockey left wingers
Ice hockey people from Tampere
KOOVEE players
Lempäälän Kisa players
Finnish expatriate ice hockey players in France